Tauzeeh Al-Qur'an Asan Tarjuma Quran is a three-volume tafsir (exegesis) of the Quran written by Pakistani Islamic scholar Mufti Taqi Usmani (born 1943). The book was originally written in Urdu and has been translated into at least two languages, Bengali and Hindi.

Background 
Citing the reason for writing the book, the author says,

Features 
This translation is not entirely literal, nor is it so independent that it deviates from the Qur'an vocabulary.  Every effort has been made to keep the translation close to the wording of the Qur'an, with a focus on simplicity and clarity.  Where there is more than one Tafsir space in the word, the space is also included in the translation.  And where this has not been possible, the interpretation of the Salaf, that is, the predecessors, has been translated according to what the author thinks is most correct.  The explanatory notes only point out that if the reader encounters a problem in understanding the meaning of the verse while reading the translation, he can resolve it with the help of annotations.  Long explanatory analysis and theoretical discussions have not been introduced.  Attempts have also been made to cover the short notes.

Structure 
At the beginning of the main text, the author writes a brief introduction to the text.  Then a discussion entitled "Revelation and Why?"  Topics covered include: Requirement of Revelation, Method of Revelation, Date of Revelation, First Verse, Meccan and Madani Verses, Periodic Descent, Shaan e Nuzul, History of Preservation of Quran, Manzil, Para, Ruku, Waqf, the science of Tafsir and common misconceptions about it, etc.  At the beginning of each Surah there is some relevant discussion about the Surah under the heading "Introduction".  Then the author gradually translated the verses of the Qur'an first.  Then a brief explanation of the translated verse is attached, Surahs discussed in sections:
 Volume 1 - From Surah Al-Fatihah to Surah At-Tawbah
 Volume 2 - From Surah Al-Yunus to Surah Al-Ankabut
 Volume 3 - From Surah Ar-Rum to Surah Al-Nas

Translation 

The book has been translated into at least two languages, Bengali and Hindi. It was translated into Bengali by Abul Bashar Muhammad Saiful Islam in 2010 and published by Maktabatul Ashraf.

See also

Muhammad Taqi Usmani bibliography
 List of tafsir works
 List of Sunni books

References

Bibliography
 Nawi, Jaharuddin;  Md.  Marzuki, Junaidah (2016).  "The Contributions of Mufti Muhammad Taqi Usmani and His Scholars in the Study of the Qur'an".  Al-Irshad: Journal of Islam and Contemporary Affairs (in English).  2 (1): 1818.

External links
 Tauzeeh Al-Qur'an Urdu
Tauzeeh Al-Qur'an Bangla

Urdu-language books
Deobandi literature
Sunni tafsir
Books by Muhammad Taqi Usmani